In mathematics, in the area of harmonic analysis, the fractional Fourier transform (FRFT) is a family of linear transformations generalizing the Fourier transform. It can be thought of as the Fourier transform to the n-th power, where n need not be an integer — thus, it can transform a function to any intermediate domain between time and frequency. Its applications range from filter design and signal analysis to phase retrieval and pattern recognition.

The FRFT can be used to define fractional convolution, correlation, and other operations, and can also be further generalized into the linear canonical transformation (LCT).  An early definition of the FRFT was introduced by Condon, by solving for the Green's function for phase-space rotations, and also by Namias, generalizing work of Wiener on Hermite polynomials.

However, it was not widely recognized in signal processing until it was independently reintroduced around 1993 by several groups. Since then, there has been a surge of interest in extending Shannon's sampling theorem for signals which are band-limited in the Fractional Fourier domain.

A completely different meaning for "fractional Fourier transform" was introduced by Bailey and Swartztrauber as essentially another name for a z-transform, and in particular for the case that corresponds to a discrete Fourier transform shifted by a fractional amount in frequency space (multiplying the input by a linear chirp) and evaluating at a fractional set of frequency points (e.g. considering only a small portion of the spectrum).  (Such transforms can be evaluated efficiently by Bluestein's FFT algorithm.) This terminology has fallen out of use in most of the technical literature, however, in preference to the FRFT. The remainder of this article describes the FRFT.

Introduction
The continuous Fourier transform  of a function  is a unitary operator of  space that maps the function  to its frequential version  (all expressions are taken in the  sense, rather than pointwise):

Let us study its n-th iterated  defined by 
Their sequence is finite since  is a 4-periodic automorphism: for every function , .

More precisely, let us introduce the parity operator  that inverts , . Then the following properties hold:

The FRFT provides a family of linear transforms that further extends this definition to handle non-integer powers  of the FT.

Definition
Although these two forms are equivalent, one must be careful about which definition the author uses.

Formally, this formula is only valid when the input function is in a sufficiently nice space (such as L1 or Schwartz space), and is defined via a density argument, in a way similar to that of the ordinary Fourier transform (see article), in the general case.

If  is an integer multiple of π, then the cotangent and cosecant functions above diverge.  However, this can be handled by taking the limit, and leads to a Dirac delta function in the integrand.  More directly, since  

For  , this becomes precisely the definition of the continuous Fourier transform, and for   it is the definition of the inverse continuous Fourier transform.

The FRFT argument   is neither a spatial one   nor a frequency . We will see why it can be interpreted as linear combination of both coordinates .

Remark: with the angular frequency ω convention instead of the frequency one, the FRFT formula is the Mehler kernel,

Properties
The -th order fractional Fourier transform operator, has the properties:

Additivity
For any real angles ,

Linearity

Integer Orders

Moreover, it has following relation

Inverse

Commutativity

Associativity

Unitarity

Time Reversal

Transform of a shifted function

Define the shift and the phase shift operators as follows:

Then

that is,

Transform of a scaled function
Define the scaling and chirp multiplication operators as follows:

Then, 

Rather, the fractional Fourier transform of  turns out to be a scaled and chirp modulated version of  where  is a different order.

Fractional kernel
The FRFT is an integral transform

where the α-angle kernel is

The FRFT has the same properties as its kernels :
 symmetry: 
 inverse: 
 additivity:

Related transforms
There also exist related fractional generalizations of similar transforms such as the discrete Fourier transform.

 The discrete fractional Fourier transform is defined by Zeev Zalevsky. A quantum algorithm to implement a version of the discrete fractional Fourier transform in sub-polynomial time is described by Somma.
 The Fractional wavelet transform (FRWT) is a generalization of the classical wavelet transform in the fractional Fourier transform domains.
 The chirplet transform for a related generalization of the wavelet transform.

Generalizations
The Fourier transform is essentially bosonic; it works because it is consistent with the superposition principle and related interference patterns.  There is also a fermionic Fourier transform. These have been generalized into a supersymmetric FRFT, and a supersymmetric Radon transform.  There is also a fractional Radon transform, a symplectic FRFT, and a symplectic wavelet transform.  Because quantum circuits are based on unitary operations, they are useful for computing integral transforms as the latter are unitary operators on a function space.  A quantum circuit has been designed which implements the FRFT.

Interpretation

The usual interpretation of the Fourier transform is as a transformation of a time domain signal into a frequency domain signal. On the other hand, the interpretation of the inverse Fourier transform is as a transformation of a frequency domain signal into a time domain signal. Fractional Fourier transforms  transform a signal (either in the time domain or frequency domain) into the domain between time and frequency: it is a rotation in the time–frequency domain. This perspective is generalized by the linear canonical transformation, which generalizes the fractional Fourier transform and allows linear transforms of the time–frequency domain other than rotation.

Take the  figure below as an example. If the signal in the time domain is rectangular (as below), it   becomes a sinc function in the frequency domain. But if  one applies the fractional Fourier transform to the rectangular signal, the transformation output will be in the domain between time and frequency.

The fractional Fourier transform is a rotation operation on a time–frequency distribution. From the definition above, for α = 0, there will be no change after applying the fractional Fourier transform, while for α = π/2, the fractional Fourier transform becomes a plain Fourier transform, which rotates the time–frequency distribution with π/2. For other value of α, the fractional Fourier transform rotates the time–frequency distribution according to α. The following figure shows the results of the fractional Fourier transform with different values of α.

Application
Fractional Fourier transform can be used in time frequency analysis and DSP. It is useful to filter noise, but with the condition that it does not overlap with the desired signal in the time–frequency domain. Consider the following example. We cannot apply a filter directly to eliminate the noise, but with the help of the fractional Fourier transform, we can rotate the signal (including the desired signal and noise) first. We then apply a specific filter, which will allow only the desired signal to pass. Thus the noise will be removed completely. Then we use the fractional Fourier transform again to rotate the signal back and we can get the desired signal.

Thus, using just truncation in the time domain, or equivalently low-pass filters in the frequency domain, one can cut out any convex set in time–frequency space. In contrast, using time domain or frequency domain tools without a fractional Fourier transform would only allow cutting out rectangles parallel to the axes.

Fractional Fourier transforms also have applications in quantum physics. For example, they are used to formulate entropic uncertainty relations.

They are also useful in the design of optical systems and for optimizing holographic storage efficiency.

See also
 Least-squares spectral analysis
 Fractional calculus
 Mehler kernel
Other time–frequency transforms:
 Linear canonical transformation
 Short-time Fourier transform
 Wavelet transform
 Chirplet transform
 Cone-shape distribution function
 Quadratic Fourier transform

References

Bibliography

External links
 DiscreteTFDs -- software for computing the fractional Fourier transform and time–frequency distributions
"Fractional Fourier Transform" by Enrique Zeleny, The Wolfram Demonstrations Project.
 Dr YangQuan Chen's FRFT (Fractional Fourier Transform) Webpages
 LTFAT - A free (GPL) Matlab / Octave toolbox Contains several version of the fractional Fourier transform.

Fourier analysis
Time–frequency analysis
Integral transforms
Articles containing video clips